Crocus tommasinianus, the woodland crocus, early crocus, or Tommasini's crocus, is a flower named after the botanist Muzio G. Spirito de Tommasini (1794-1879). It is native to Bulgaria, Hungary, Albania, and the former Yugoslavia. It is often referred to as the early or snow crocus, but these terms are shared with several other species, although C. tommasinianus is amongst the first to bloom. Multiple plants are often called tommies in the horticultural trade.

Description

It is a cormous perennial of the genus Crocus in the family Iridaceae with a lilac flower, and is one of the smaller of the cultivated species. A variant, C. tommasinianus f. albus, is white. Its cultivars are used as ornamental plants. Height:

Habitat
The species is found growing around 1000 meters in woods and on shady hillsides, commonly on limestone with flowering occurring in January and February; the narrow leaves are fully developed by the time the purple flowers with white tubes blooms.

Cultivation 

It naturalizes easily earning an official recognition as a weed and is naturalized in the US state of Delaware. It is often planted in large drifts in gardens and parks.

This plant has gained the Royal Horticultural Society's Award of Garden Merit.

Cultivars

Examples:
'Barr's Purple' (amethyst violet)
'Lilac Beauty' (purple)
'Roseus' (Pink Snow)
'Ruby Giant' (purple) 
'Whitewell Purple' (silvery reddish purple flowers, pale mauve on the inside)

References

External links

 Paghat's Garden
 The Plant Expert
 BBC
 Alpine House - Crocus Group 
 Kew Plant List

tommasinianus
Garden plants
Flora of Europe
Plants described in 1847